Rhythm and praise is another term for Christian R&B music. It's a type of music combining Christian-themed lyrics with the common musical characteristics of rhythm and blues.

Terminology 
The term rhythm and praise is not just an offshoot of the term rhythm and blues, but also has a spiritual meaning for the musicians specializing in this form of music. Blues, or singing the blues, is attributed to sadness, depression, hopelessness, loneliness, or worrisome. According to some Christians, music should be inspirational and not invoke depression, as referenced in the following biblical scriptures:
 Psalms 47:6 - Sing praises to God, sing praises; Sing praises to our King, sing praises.
 Acts 16:25 - But about midnight Paul and Silas were praying and singing hymns of praise to God, and the prisoners were listening to them.
 Ephesians 5:18-19 - Be filled with the Spirit, speaking to one another in psalms and hymns and spiritual songs, singing and making melody with your heart to the Lord.
 Philippians 4:8 - Finally, brothers, whatever is true, whatever is noble, whatever is right, whatever is pure, whatever is lovely, whatever is admirable—if anything is excellent or praiseworthy—think about such things.
 Ephesians 4:29 - Let no unwholesome word proceed from your mouth, but only such a word as is good for edification according to the need of the moment, so that it will give grace to those who hear.

The last two biblical passages listed above are not talking about music specifically, but they do set the benchmark for which many Christian artists write their lyrics. However, this is not to say Christian musicians do not sing about their troubles and pains. What sets them apart from most other singers is that the Christian artists are inclined to lyrically mention God or Jesus Christ as the solution to their burdens, thereby creating a happy ending so to speak, or at least provide hope to the listeners who may be going through a similar hardship mentioned in said songs. However, in his book Sound of Light, Don Cusic writes:

Contemporary Christianity tend to ignore some aspects of the [biblical book of] Psalms—the themes for revenge, fear, doubting, frustration, and outrage. Yet these are all part of the Psalms, although modern songwriters prefer to emphasize only the praise and worship aspects of the Psalms. Still, the Psalms show us songs of individual expression, of earthly concerns, of personal cries of pain and help. 

In an interview with Sketch the Journalist on the Houston Chronicle, DJ D-Lite pointed out that the term rhythm & praise originated from the gospel singing duo Dawkins and Dawkins on their album Focus (released in 1998), with one of the songs being entitled The Rhythm and the Praise. He goes on to say that, from there, artists made it become a subgenre, calling it R&P for short.

Despite musicians’ reason to use the term praise over blues, no historical texts about rhythm and blues would associate the genre’s name to sadness. The original term for this style of music was race music, because it was predominantly performed by African-Americans. People found that term to be offensive. In the late 1940s, Jerry Wexler, a writer for the Billboard music magazine who would later become a record producer, coined the term rhythm and blues as a way to describe the music. It is probable that the rhythm part of the name rhythm and blues described the music’s up-tempo vibe of that time. The term blues of the genre is probably borrowed from jump blues music, since jump blues evolved into R&B.

Contrarily, some singers who ascribe to the Christian faith (or record songs with lyrics influenced by such worldview) still refer to themselves as rhythm and blues artists. This may be because they haven’t heard the term rhythm and praise before, or they may market themselves as rhythm and blues because that is what the masses are inclined to label this form of music as. Most music services, music websites, and even entertainment companies do not recognize rhythm & praise as an official music subgenre, leaving people to categorize this music instead as Christian/R&B, Gospel/R&B, Contemporary Christian/Contemporary Rhythm and Blues, Urban Contemporary Gospel, or any variation of these.

References

Contemporary Christian music